Phaenomena Aratea may refer to:

A work by Aratus (3rd century BC)
based on the above:
a work by Cicero (1st century BC)
a work by Germanicus (1st century BC or 1st century AD)
famously, Germanicus, Aratea (Leiden, Universiteitsbibliotheek, Voss. lat. Q 79)
the Carolingian De ordine ac positione stellarum in signis